Matt Flanagan (born March 26, 1995) is an American football tight end who is a free agent. He played college football at Pittsburgh, and was signed as an undrafted free agent by the Washington Redskins in 2018.

Early life and high school
Flanagan grew up in Chester, New Jersey and attended West Morris Mendham High School. He played football and ran track for the Minutemen.

College career

Rutgers
Flanagan spent the first four years of his collegiate career playing for the Rutgers Scarlet Knights, redshirting his freshman season. He began as a walk-on but eventually earned a scholarship. Over three seasons, Flanagan appeared in 33 games (17 starts) and had 18 total receptions for the Scarlet Knights.

Pittsburgh
After his redshirt junior season, Flanagan transferred to the University of Pittsburgh for his final season of eligibility as a graduate transfer. He started nine games for the Panthers before a season-ending injury, catching 17 passes for 160 yards.

Professional career

Washington Redskins
Flanagan signed with the Washington Redskins as an undrafted free agent on April 29, 2018. He was cut at the end of training camp and subsequently re-signed to the team's practice squad on September 2, 2018. Flanagan was promoted to the Redskins' active roster on December 15, 2018. He made his NFL debut on December 16, 2018, in a 16–13 win against the Jacksonville Jaguars. He made his first career catch, a 14-yard reception, in the Redskins' final game of the season against the Philadelphia Eagles. He appeared in three games as a rookie, playing primarily as a blocking tight end.

Flanagan was waived/injured during final roster cuts on August 31, 2019, and reverted to the team's injured reserve list the next day. He was waived from injured reserve with an injury settlement on September 5.

Jacksonville Jaguars
Flanagan was brought in for workouts by several teams during 2019 NFL season, but was not signed by any team. Flanagan had a tryout with the Jacksonville Jaguars on August 20, 2020. He was signed on August 22, 2020. He was waived on September 5, 2020 and signed to the practice squad the next day. He was released on September 18.

References

External links
 Rutgers Scarlet Knights bio
 Pitt Panthers bio
 Washington Redskins bio

1995 births
Living people
People from Chester Borough, New Jersey
Players of American football from New Jersey
Sportspeople from Morris County, New Jersey
West Morris Mendham High School alumni
American football tight ends
Rutgers Scarlet Knights football players
Pittsburgh Panthers football players
Washington Redskins players
Jacksonville Jaguars players